The 1919 Haskell Indians football team was an American football team that represented the Haskell Indian Institute (now known as Haskell Indian Nations University) as an independent during the 1919 college football season. In its first season under head coach Bud Saunders, Haskell compiled an 8–2–1 record, shut out five opponents, and outscored opponents by a total of 218 to 53.

Schedule

References

Haskell
Haskell Indian Nations Fighting Indians football seasons
Haskell Indians football